Amy Ronayne Krause is a judge of the Michigan Court of appeals 4th District.

She has a bachelor's degree from the University of Michigan and a Juris Doctor degree from the University of Notre Dame.  She was appointed to the appeals court in 2010.  Before that she served for eight years as a district judge in Lansing.

Sources
Michigan Appeals Court bio

Living people
University of Michigan alumni
University of Notre Dame alumni
Michigan state court judges
American women judges
Year of birth missing (living people)
Place of birth missing (living people)
21st-century American women